The Journal of the American Academy of Dermatology, sometimes abbreviated JAAD, is a monthly peer-reviewed medical journal covering dermatology. It was established in 1979 and is published by Elsevier on behalf of the American Academy of Dermatology, of which it is the official journal. The editor-in-chief is Dirk Elston (Medical University of South Carolina). According to the Journal Citation Reports, the journal has a 2017 impact factor of 6.898.
JAAD has a companion journal focusing on case reports called JAAD Case Reports.

References

External links

Dermatology journals
Monthly journals
Elsevier academic journals
Publications established in 1979
Academic journals associated with learned and professional societies of the United States
English-language journals